Corpus Christi College may refer to the following colleges:

Corpus Christi College, Cambridge, a constituent college within Cambridge University, United Kingdom
Corpus Christi College, Oxford, a constituent college within Oxford University, United Kingdom
Corpus Christi College (Vancouver), Vancouver, Canada
Corpus Christi College, Melbourne, Victoria, Australia
Corpus Christi College, Perth, Western Australia
Corpus Christi College (Enugu State), in Achi, Enugu State, Nigeria
Corpus Christi College (Ekiti State), in Ilawe Ekiti, Ekiti State, Nigeria

See also
Corpus Christi Catholic College, a comprehensive school in Leeds, England